Zoltán Bitskey (10 January 1904 – 1 August 1988) was a Hungarian swimmer who won a silver medal in the 4×200 m freestyle relay at the 1926 European Aquatics Championships. He competed in the 200 m breaststroke event at the 1924 Summer Olympics, but did not reach the finals.

His younger brother, Aladár Bitskey, was also a Hungarian Olympic swimmer.

References

1904 births
1988 deaths
Sportspeople from Zvolen
Swimmers at the 1924 Summer Olympics
Olympic swimmers of Hungary
Hungarian male swimmers
European Aquatics Championships medalists in swimming
Hungarian male freestyle swimmers
20th-century Hungarian people